Schuyler County is a county in the U.S. state of Illinois. According to the 2010 census, it had a population of 7,544. Its county seat is Rushville.

History
Schuyler County was formed in 1825 out of Pike and Fulton counties. It is named for Philip Schuyler, member of the Continental Congress and Senator from New York.

Geography

Climate and weather

Major highways

  U.S. Highway 24
  U.S. Highway 67
  Illinois Route 99
  Illinois Route 100
  Illinois Route 101
  Illinois Route 103

Adjacent counties

 Hancock County (northwest)
 McDonough County (north)
 Fulton County (northeast)
 Mason County (east)
 Cass County (southeast)
 Brown County (south)
 Adams County (southwest)

Demographics

As of the 2010 United States Census, there were 7,544 people, 3,040 households, and 2,014 families residing in the county. The racial makeup of the county was 95.5% white, 3.2% black or African American, 0.2% American Indian, 0.1% Asian, 0.5% from other races, and 0.5% from two or more races. Those of Hispanic or Latino origin made up 1.2% of the population. In terms of ancestry, 26.8% were American, 20.2% were German, 13.1% were English, and 12.0% were Irish.

Of the 3,040 households, 28.2% had children under the age of 18 living with them, 53.5% were married couples living together, 7.6% had a female householder with no husband present, 33.8% were non-families, and 28.6% of all households were made up of individuals. The average household size was 2.33 and the average family size was 2.83. The median age was 43.6 years.

The median income for a household in the county was $43,686 and the median income for a family was $51,654. Males had a median income of $40,998 versus $28,810 for females. The per capita income for the county was $20,649. About 8.6% of families and 14.0% of the population were below the poverty line, including 16.8% of those under age 18 and 14.1% of those age 65 or over.

Politics
Schuyler County is located in Illinois's 18th Congressional District and is currently represented by Republican Darin LaHood. For the Illinois House of Representatives, the county is located in the 93rd district and is currently represented by Republican Norine Hammond. The county is located in the 47th district of the Illinois Senate, and is currently represented by Republican Jil Tracy.

In presidential elections, Schuyler County usually favors Republican candidates, having voted for Democratic presidential candidates in only four elections during the period of 1944–2020. Since 1944, the Democratic candidate has won a majority of the vote in Schuyler County only once (in 1964).

Communities

City
 Rushville (seat)

Villages
 Browning
 Camden
 Littleton

Unincorporated communities

 Bader
 Bluff City
 Brooklyn
 Frederick
 Huntsville
 Sheldons Grove
 Sugar Grove

Townships

 Bainbridge
 Birmingham
 Brooklyn
 Browning
 Buena Vista
 Camden
 Frederick
 Hickory
 Huntsville
 Littleton
 Oakland
 Rushville
 Woodstock

See also
 National Register of Historic Places listings in Schuyler County

References

External links
 Schuyler Tourism
 Schuyler Fact Sheet

 
1825 establishments in Illinois
Illinois counties
Populated places established in 1825